The National Organization of the Scouts of Ukraine (Natsionalna organizatsiya skautiv Ukrajiny, NOSU)  is an all-Ukrainian non-profit youth public organization that enables young people to play a constructive role in society through non-formal education. NOSU is a member of the World Organization of the Scout Movement (WOSM) and participates in international Scouting events and activities. It was established in 2007 by the representatives of three largest Scout organizations in Ukraine, the all-Ukrainian youth organization "SPOK", Plast and the All-Ukrainian organization Sich (Січ) meaning Cossack fortress and some local groups. Since then it has grown to become one of the largest youth organizations in the country. Membership stood at 4,650 Scouts in 2011.

Establishment of NOSU
The first mention of Scouts in Ukraine dates back to 1908. Scout groups worked actively in Ukraine until Soviet times, particularly in Kyiv. With the rise of Soviet power, the Scout Movement was banned throughout Ukraine and replaced by a pioneer organization that was fully politicized and dependent on the Soviet government.

The revival of Scouting in Ukraine began in the early 1990s. WOSM helped revive Scouting and encouraged various NSOs worldwide to join this initiative. For example, the Scouts of France helped develop Scouting in the eastern regions of Ukraine. In the central part of Ukraine, Scouting was re-established by SPOK (abbreviation: independence, decency, optimism, intelligence), and in the western regions, the organisation Plast started its active development.

In 2004, the Ukrainian Scout Youth Public Organization Spilka Pionerskykh Orhanizatzii Kyïva (literally Kyiv Pioneer Movement Organization or SPOK, with a membership of 3,750 in 18 of 26 Ukrainian oblasts) applied for WOSM membership. In January, 2005, this motion was recommended by the World Scout Bureau. Since more than 5% of the National Scouting Organizations voted against the application, Germany and the Boy Scouts of America among the opposing votes, SPOK was not admitted to WOSM and withdrew the application. As a result of this, a special mission of the World Scout Committee was sent to Ukraine. Ukrainian Scouting endeavoured to set up a new Scouting body unifying Plast and SPOK in order to satisfy WOSM requirements, to be worked out by 2008, as all parties were motivated to join the international community.

Following the recommendations of Resolution 2/05 adopted by the 37th World Scout Conference in Tunisia, the constitutive congress of the National Organization of the Scouts of Ukraine (NOSU) was held on 27 March 2007. The congress, which gathered Scout representatives from most regions of Ukraine, approved the Constitution of NOSU and elected its governing bodies. This event was made possible thanks to efforts of three Scout associations (Plast, SPOK and Sich) to work towards unification of Scouting in Ukraine in a new single National Scout Organization so as to be able to join WOSM.

The Constitution of NOSU was officially registered by the Ministry of Justice of Ukraine in November 2007, thus confirming the creation of a single National Scout Organization in Ukraine. An amended version of this Constitution was received on 4 February 2008 and formally approved by the Constitutions Committee and the World Scout Committee.

In 2008, NOSU applied for membership through the World Scout Bureau into the World Organization of the Scout Movement. In accordance with the requirements of the Constitution of WOSM, the World Scout Committee considered this application at its meeting from 29 February to 2 March 2008, and recommended that it be accepted. Under the terms of Article VI.2 of the WOSM Constitution, "if within three months the recommendation is unopposed or opposed by less than five percent of the Member Organizations", NOSU was declared a Member, as the National Scout Organization of Ukraine, of the World Organization of the Scout Movement as from 1 July 2008.

WOSM Acting Secretary General Luc Panissod visited NOSU in mid-March 2008. He had the opportunity to meet and talk with various groups of young people (candidates to join, patrol leaders, summer camp young leaders) and adult leaders responsible of local Scout groups. He also met with the Deputy Minister of Family, Youth and Sports, one of the founding members of one of the Scout associations, who confirmed full support of the authorities to NOSU. He also had several working sessions with leaders of NOSU to assess the level of development of the organization.

The organization has a loaned headquarters and several campsites. Elements of a progressive scheme include merit badges, which are illustrated in their handbook and are obtained on a progressive basis. At present, NOSU is a small organization and has only one professional staff regularly employed in application of existing legislation. Being a new organization, NOSU still has to develop an efficient working organization.

NOSU membership is open to girls, boys, women and men, in three age sections: Cubs (6-10), Scouts (11-16) and Rovers (16-24). As at 31 December 2007, NOSU comprised 2,475 members including 718 female youth members, 1,546 male youth members, plus some 200 adult leaders and Council members.

As of February 1, 2015 there are 1220 active members and 3430 scouts who are non-members but now and then participate in the events.

NOSU membership was made approximately of 40% from Plast, 40% from SPOK and 20% from Sich. The same percentages was reflected at the National Council level. While double membership still exists (one can be member of NOSU and member of one of the three above associations), direct membership for new members is strongly encouraged. It is the objective of NOSU's leadership that NOSU will be successful enough to attract more members from the three associations who are not yet members of NOSU. Further unification of Scouting through integration of other Scout groups in Ukraine is envisaged through the chartering system. 

On May 4, 2014 during the fourth national conference of NOSU the new National Council was elected.

The Chairman of the National Council is Andriy Chesnokov, the First Deputy Chairman of the National Council is Oleg Sizenenko. All duties in Ukrainian Scouting, from local to the National Council levels, are performed by a combination of volunteer workers and paid professionals. NOSU is a member of the Eurasia Scout Region.
The representative of NOSU - Andriy Chesnokov - is a member of Eurasia Scouting Committee of WOSM 

According to the decision of the 4th National Conference of NOSU that took place on May 18, 2014 in Kyiv the new leadership of the Organization was elected.
Andriy CHESNOKOV has been elected the Head of the National Councill of NOSU  (President of NSO Ukraine).

The new National Council includes representatives of different parts of Ukraine – Donetsk, Kyiv, Lviv, Mykolayiv, Zaporizhzhya regions.
The Control Commission consists of scouts from Kyiv, Lviv, Donetsk, Mykolayiv regions and Sevastopol.
During the first meeting of the National Council, Natalia MIROSHNICHENKO was appointed the National Secretary of NOSU.

NOSU Operation 
NOSU helps young people develop their full potential and become responsible, active members of their communities. NOSU achieves this through a variety of programs that focus on building character, leadership skills, and a sense of social responsibility. These programs include outdoor activities, community service projects, and educational workshops.

NOSU is open to all young people starting from the age of 6, regardless of their gender, nationality, or religion. The organization is run by volunteers who are passionate about youth development and committed to the principles of the Scouting movement, which include the Scout Law and Scout Promise.

NOSU is a member of the World Organization of the Scout Movement (WOSM) and participates in international Scouting events and activities. The organization also works closely with other youth organizations in Ukraine and around the world to promote youth development and social change.

Through its programs and activities, NOSU helps young people develop important life skills, including teamwork, problem-solving, and communication. It also provides a safe and supportive environment where young people can make new friends, learn about different cultures, and have fun.

Mission and Vision 
NOSU Mission

The development of the Ukrainian society by creating conditions for the full formation of an individual using the Scout method.

NOSU Vision

In 2025, we see the National Organization of the Scouts of Ukraine as an open, accessible, dynamic, numerous organization that is recognized in Ukraine and in the world. NOSU's activities have a significant social impact and influence youth policy at all levels. Due to an interesting and effective National Youth Program and adult leadership training system, Scouting is recognized by the state as an effective non-formal education based on the Scout values. NOSU Scouts are responsible citizens and patriots of Ukraine; they do good deeds to change the world for the better.

Working methods 
In terms of education, NOSU has a Youth Programme, which, according to NOSU leaders, meets the needs of young people in the association and in society today. Provisions exist to regularly review the Youth Programme (YP). Elements of a progressive scheme include merit badges, which are illustrated in their handbook and are obtained on a progressive basis. It has an active strategy to recruit youth members and supports youth involvement at all levels. It is implemented though the elements of the Scout method and focuses on the all-round developing. It aims at building character, leadership skills, and a sense of social responsibility. YP includes outdoor activities, community service projects, and educational workshops. 

NOSU Scouts are divided into four age sections, each of which has its program considering children's interests and age characteristics, based on the Scout Method:

 Cub-Scouts 6-10 years
 Scouts 11-14 years
 Ventures 15-18 years
 Rovers 18-24 years

The adult policy aims at supporting leadership and recruitment of volunteers, and there is a training scheme for leaders, and training is carried out regularly. Every person 18+ can become a Scout leader or work at the national level.

Through its programs and activities, NOSU helps young people develop important life skills, including teamwork, problem-solving, and communication. It also provides a safe and supportive environment where young people can make new friends, learn about different cultures, and have fun.

Ukrainian Scout uniform and scarf

Each Scout has a Scout uniform, where badges are located. They show the skills of the Scout, to which Scout group they belong, which events they have already attended etc.

The most valuable thing for every Scout is a Scout scarf. At the national level, the scarf is blue with a yellow ribbon and the coat of arms of Ukraine. Each Scout group is allowed and encouraged to have its own Scout scarf, which would reflect the individuality of this group.

NOSU history in dates

March 24, 2007 - AYPO "The National Organization of the Scouts of Ukraine" (NOSU) was established at the founding Congress in Kyiv.

March 28, 2008 – the President of Ukraine signed the Decree # 279/2008 "On the development of the Scout Movement in Ukraine"

July 14–18, 2008 – Ukraine joined the World Scouting as NOSU became the Member of the World Organization of the Scout Movement at the 38th World Scout Conference in Jeju, South Korea.

2011-2012 – Celebration at the national level of Centenary of Ukrainian Scouting:

November 1, 2011 - the Parliament of Ukraine (Verkhovna Rada) adopted the Resolution "On the Celebration of 100th Anniversary of Ukrainian Scout Movement", initialized by NOSU;

April 21, 2012 - Ukrainian scouts were parading on the main street of Kyiv - the capital of Ukraine, celebrating 100 years from the date of the first Ukrainian Scout Oath;

April 28- May 2, 2012 the All-Ukrainian Centenary Scout Forum took place. President of Ukraine congratulated Ukrainian scouts on 100th anniversary of the national movement;

April 29, 2012 "100 years of Ukrainian Scouting" memorial was inaugurated in the Korsun-Shevchenko district of Cherkasy region of Ukraine.

2008-2012 – NOSU established the local branches in 22 regions of Ukraine

May 19, 2013 – the number of Scouts registered in NOSU raised up to 2724 members.

October 1–6, 2013 - NOSU was the host of 2nd Eurasia Regional Scout Youth Forum and the 5th Eurasia Regional Scout Conference 

May 18, 2014 - along with ex-scouts participating in activities and Merbership of Peace program volunteers NOSU membership raised 4650.

Also Related 
Scouting in Ukraine
Nika Gorovska

References 

World Organization of the Scout Movement member organizations
Scouting and Guiding in Ukraine
Organizations established in 2007
2007 establishments in Ukraine